Ecotat Gardens and Arboretum (37 ha / 91 acres) is a non-profit gardens and arboretum located on Route 2 in Hermon, Maine, United States. They are open to the public without charge during daylight hours for tours, hikes, and cross-country skiing.

The site is home to over 55 gardens containing over 1500 herbaceous species and 130 woody species. The Arboretum contains 280 varieties of trees, including mature stands of Eastern White Pine, White Spruce, Tamarack Larch, Northern White Cypress, Red oak, White Ash, Red Maple, and Quaking Aspen, as well as a marsh.

See also 
 List of botanical gardens in the United States

External links
 Ecotat website

Arboreta in Maine
Botanical gardens in Maine
Protected areas of Penobscot County, Maine
Tourist attractions in Penobscot County, Maine